Golden Emperor International Ltd. or commonly known as GeIL is a manufacturer of computer hardware components, based in Taipei, Taiwan with focus in DRAM and flash based memory products since 1993. Since then, GeIL has been concentrating in memory module design and manufacturing technology. The company employs around 300 people as of Q1 2009 with distribution in 50 countries worldwide. GeIL’s headquarters is located in Taipei, Taiwan, with branches in Hong Kong and China.

Product Information

DRAM Products

 DDR2/3/4 Long Dimm & SO-Dimm
 Industrial Memory - DDR2 & DDR3
 Server Dimm
 Memory Cooling Systems

Flash Products
 USB Drive

See also 
 List of companies of Taiwan

References 

 Techware Labs review on GeIL DDR3 EVO ONE 12GB Hexa-Channel Kit
 The Inquirer review on GeIL DDR3 Green Series Lower Power Consumption Dual Channel Kit

External links 
 GeIL Official Website

Taiwanese companies established in 1993
Computer memory companies
Companies based in Taipei
Electronics companies established in 1993
Electronics companies of Taiwan
Taiwanese brands